The Thassim Beevi Abdul Kader College for Women, is a women's general degree college located in Kilakarai, Tamil Nadu. It was established in the year 1988. The college is affiliated with Alagappa University. This college offers different courses in arts, commerce and science.

Top arts college in ramanathapuram

Top women's colleges in tamilnadu

top arts and science colleges in tamilnadu

Thassim Beevi Abdul Kader College for Women Top arts college in ramanathapuram | Top women's colleges in tamilnadu | top arts and science colleges in tamilnadu

Departments

Science
Chemistry
Mathematics
Microbiology
Psychology
Home Science
Computer Science
Information Technology

Arts and Commerce
Tamil
Arabic
English
Hindi
Physical Education
Business Administration
Commerce

Accreditation
The college is  recognized by the University Grants Commission (UGC).

References

External links

Educational institutions established in 1988
1988 establishments in Tamil Nadu
Colleges affiliated to Alagappa University